Song of Rondane (Norwegian: Sangen om Rondane) is a 1934 Norwegian drama film directed by  Helge Lunde and starring  Kirsten Heiberg, Georg Løkkeberg and Einar Vaage.

It was shot on location in Rondane.

Cast
 Kirsten Heiberg  as Greta  
 Georg Løkkeberg  as Knut, en gjetergutt  
 Einar Vaage  as Grossereren  
 Sonja Wigert  as Astrid  
 Ottar Wicklund  as Hans, Knuts bror  
 Arne Bang-Hansen  as Erik, Gretas bror 
 Ole Grepp  as Petter  
 Theodor Hald  as Hallomannen  
 Thoralf Klouman  as Doktoren  
 Dagmar Myhrvold  as Kari, Knuts mor  
 Gerd-Lise Nore  as Datter av Greta  
 Eva Steen  as Tanten  
 Einar Tveito  as En hestehandler

References

Bibliography 
 Alfred Krautz. International directory of cinematographers, set- and costume designers in film, Volume 5. Saur, 1986.

External links 
 

1934 films
1934 drama films
Norwegian drama films
1930s Norwegian-language films
Films directed by Helge Lunde
Norwegian black-and-white films